The President's Commission on the Assassination of President Kennedy, known unofficially as the Warren Commission, was established by President Lyndon B. Johnson through  on November 29, 1963, to investigate the assassination of United States President John F. Kennedy that had taken place on November 22, 1963.

The U.S. Congress passed Senate Joint Resolution 137 authorizing the Presidential appointed Commission to report on the assassination of President John F. Kennedy, mandating the attendance and testimony of witnesses and the production of evidence. Its 888-page final report was presented to President Johnson on September 24, 1964, and made public three days later.

It concluded that President Kennedy was assassinated by Lee Harvey Oswald and that Oswald acted entirely alone. It also concluded that Jack Ruby acted alone when he killed Oswald two days later. The Commission's findings have proven controversial and have been both challenged and supported by later studies.

The Commission took its unofficial name—the Warren Commission—from its chairman, Chief Justice Earl Warren. According to published transcripts of Johnson's presidential phone conversations, some major officials were opposed to forming such a commission and several commission members took part only reluctantly. One of their chief reservations was that a commission would ultimately create more controversy than consensus.

Formation
The creation of the Warren Commission was a direct consequence of the murder by Jack Ruby of the alleged assassin Lee Harvey Oswald on 24 Nov 1963, carried live on national television in the basement of the Dallas police station.

With the impossibility of a public process associated to the mistakes of the Dallas Police Forces, which conclued that the case was closed, the doubt progressed in the public opinion.

At the same time, within American political institutions, a draft commission of inquiry led by Congress on November 27, 1963 was tabled by Senator Everett Dirksen and Representative Charles Goodell.

The creation of the Commission arose partly out of the need to calm the nation.

The new president, Lyndon Johnson, himself from Texas, the state where the double assassination had taken place, faced with the risks of a weakening of his presidency and confronted with the results obtained by the Texas authorities, themselves seriously discredited and criticized , decided, after various consultations including in particular that of J. Edgar Hoover, the director of the FBI, to create a presidential commission of inquiry by decree (executive order no. 11 130) of November 29, 1963. This act allows to avoid an independent investigation led by Congress and on the other hand not to entrust the case to the Attorney General, Robert Kennedy, deeply affected by the assassination and whose federal jurisdiction would have been applied in the event of withdrawal of the share of the State of Texas for the benefit of the federal authorities in Washington.

At the same time, Nicholas Katzenbach has been named as providing advice after the assassination of John F. Kennedy that led to the creation of the Warren Commission. On November 25 he sent a memo to Johnson's White House aide Bill Moyers recommending the formation of a Presidential Commission to investigate the assassination. To combat speculation of a conspiracy, Katzenbach said that the results of the FBI's investigation should be made public. He wrote, in part: "The public must be satisfied that Oswald was the assassin; that he did not have confederates who are still at large".

Four days after Katzenbach's memo, Johnson appointed some of the nation's most prominent figures, including the Chief Justice of the United States, to the Commission.

The new president chose to have it chaired by Earl Warren, the chief justice, eminently respected jurist and president of the Supreme Court, the highest court in the United States. At first, Earl Warren, however, refused to take the head of the commission because he stated the principle of law that a member of the judicial power could not be at the service of the executive power. It was only under pressure from President Lyndon Johnson, who spoke of international tensions and the risks of war resulting from the death of his predecessor, that the President of the Supreme Court agreed to chair the commission.

The other members of the commission were chosen from among the representatives of the Republican and Democratic parties, in both chambers (Senate and House of Representatives). Added diplomat John J. McCloy, former president of the World Bank and former CIA director, Allen Dulles, sacked by John F Kennedy in November 1961, following the resounding failure of the Bay Pigs Invasion in April 1961.

Meetings
The Warren Commission met formally for the first time on December 5, 1963, on the second floor of the National Archives Building in Washington, D.C. The Commission conducted its business primarily in closed sessions, but these were not secret sessions.

Members

Committee
Earl Warren, Chief Justice of the United States (chairman) (1891–1974)
Richard Russell Jr. (D-Georgia), U.S. Senator, (1897–1971)
John Sherman Cooper (R-Kentucky), U.S. Senator (1901–1991)
Hale Boggs (D-Louisiana), U.S. Representative, House Majority Whip (1914–1972)
Gerald Ford (R-Michigan), U.S. Representative (later 38th President of the United States), House Minority Leader (1913-2006)
Allen Dulles, former Director of Central Intelligence and head of the Central Intelligence Agency (1893–1969)
John J. McCloy, former President of the World Bank (1895–1989)

General counsel
J. Lee Rankin (1907-1996)

Assistant counsel
Francis W. H. Adams (1904–1990)
Joseph A. Ball (1902–2000)
David W. Belin (1928–1999)
William Thaddeus Coleman Jr. (1920–2017)
Melvin A. Eisenberg
Burt W. Griffin
Leon D. Hubert Jr.
Albert E. Jenner Jr. (1907–1988)
Wesley J. Liebeler　(1931-2002)
Norman Redlich (1925–2011)
W. David Slawson
Arlen Specter (1930–2012)
Samuel A. Stern
Howard P. Willens (liaison with the Department of Justice)

Staff
Philip Barson
Edward A. Conroy
John Hart Ely  (1938–2003)
Alfred Goldberg
Murray J. Laulicht
Arthur J. Marmor
Richard M. Mosk (1939–2016)
John J. O'Brien (1919–2001)
Stuart R. Pollak (1937–)
Alfredda Scobey
Charles N. Shaffer Jr.
Lloyd L. Weinreb (1936–2021)

Conclusions of the report

The report concluded that:

 The shots which killed President Kennedy and wounded Governor Connally were fired from the sixth-floor window at the southeast corner of the Texas School Book Depository.
 President Kennedy was first struck by a bullet which entered at the back of his neck and exited through the lower front portion of his neck, causing a wound which would not necessarily have been lethal. The President was struck by a second bullet, which entered the right-rear portion of his head, causing a massive and fatal wound.
 Governor Connally was struck by a bullet which entered on the right side of his back and traveled downward through the right side of his chest, exiting below his right nipple. This bullet then passed through his right wrist and entered his left thigh where it caused a superficial wound.
 There is no credible evidence that the shots were fired from the Triple Underpass, ahead of the motorcade, or from any other location.
 The weight of the evidence indicates that there were three shots fired.
 Although it is not necessary to any essential findings of the Commission to determine just which shot hit Governor Connally, there is very persuasive evidence from the experts to indicate that the same bullet which pierced the President's throat also caused Governor Connally's wounds. However, Governor Connally's testimony and certain other factors have given rise to some difference of opinion as to this probability but there is no question in the mind of any member of the Commission that all the shots which caused the President's and Governor Connally's wounds were fired from the sixth-floor window of the Texas School Book Depository.
 The shots which killed President Kennedy and wounded Governor Connally were fired by Lee Harvey Oswald.
 Oswald killed Dallas Police Patrolman J. D. Tippit approximately 45 minutes after the assassination.
 Ruby entered the basement of the Dallas Police Department and killed Lee Harvey Oswald and there is no evidence to support the rumor that Ruby may have been assisted by any members of the Dallas Police Department.
 The Commission has found no evidence that either Lee Harvey Oswald or Jack Ruby was part of any conspiracy, domestic or foreign, to assassinate President Kennedy.
 The Commission has found no evidence of conspiracy, subversion, or disloyalty to the U.S. Government by any Federal, State, or local official.
 The Commission could not make any definitive determination of Oswald's motives. 
 The Commission believes that recommendations for improvements in Presidential protection are compelled by the facts disclosed in this investigation.

Death of Lee Harvey Oswald
In response to Jack Ruby's shooting of Lee Harvey Oswald, the Warren Commission declared that the news media must share responsibility with the Dallas police department for "the breakdown of law enforcement" that led to Oswald's death. In addition to the police department's "inadequacy of coordination," the Warren Commission noted that "these additional deficiencies [in security] were related directly to the decision to admit newsmen to the basement."

The commission concluded that the pressure of press, radio, and television for information about Oswald's prison transfer resulted in lax security standards for admission to the basement, allowing Ruby to enter and subsequently shoot Oswald, noting that "the acceptance of inadequate press credentials posed a clear avenue for a one-man assault." Oswald's death was said to have been a direct result of "the failure of the police to remove Oswald secretly or control the crowd in the basement."

The consequence of Oswald's death, according to the Commission, was that "it was no longer possible to arrive at the complete story of the assassination of John F. Kennedy through normal judicial procedures during the trial of the alleged assassin." While the Commission noted that the prime responsibility was that of the police department, it also recommended the adoption of a new "code of conduct" for news professionals regarding the collecting and presenting of information to the public that would ensure "there [would] be no interference with pending criminal investigations, court proceedings, or the right of individuals to a fair trial."

Aftermath

Secret Service
The findings prompted the Secret Service to make numerous modifications to its security procedures.

The Commission made other recommendations to the Congress to adopt new legislation that would make the murder of the President (or Vice-President) a federal crime, which is was not the case in 1963.

Commission records 
In November 1964, two months after the publication of its 888-page report, the Commission published twenty-six volumes of supporting documents, including the testimony or depositions of 552 witnesses and more than 3,100 exhibits  making a total of more than 16,000 pages.

The Warren report, however, lacked an index, which greatly complicated the work of reading. It will be endowed with it by the work of Sylvia Meagher for the report and the 26 volumes of documents.

All of the commission's records were then transferred on November 23 to the National Archives. The unpublished portion of those records was initially sealed for 75 years (to 2039) under a general National Archives policy that applied to all federal investigations by the executive branch of government, a period "intended to serve as protection for innocent persons who could otherwise be damaged because of their relationship with participants in the case."

The 75-year rule no longer exists, supplanted by the Freedom of Information Act of 1966 and the JFK Records Act of 1992. By 1992, 98 percent of the Warren Commission records had been released to the public. Six years later, after the Assassination Records Review Board's work, all Warren Commission records, except those records that contained tax return information, were available to the public with redactions.

The remaining Kennedy assassination-related documents were partly released to the public on October 26, 2017, twenty-five years after the passage of the JFK Records Act. President Donald Trump, as directed by the FBI and the CIA, took action on that date to withhold certain remaining files, delaying the release until April 26, 2018, then on April 26, 2018, took action to further withhold the records "until 2021".

CIA "benign cover-up" 

CIA Director McCone was "complicit" in a Central Intelligence Agency "benign cover-up" by withholding information from the Warren Commission, according to a report by the CIA Chief Historian David Robarge released to the public in 2014. According to this report, CIA officers had been instructed to give only "passive, reactive, and selective" assistance to the commission, to keep the commission focused on "what the Agency believed at the time was the 'best truth' — that Lee Harvey Oswald, for as yet undetermined motives, had acted alone in killing John Kennedy." The CIA may have also covered up evidence of being in communication with Oswald before 1963, according to the 2014 report findings.

Also withheld were earlier CIA plots, involving CIA links with the Mafia, to assassinate Cuban president Fidel Castro, which might have been considered to provide a motive to assassinate Kennedy. The report concluded, "In the long term, the decision of John McCone and Agency leaders in 1964 not to disclose information about CIA's anti-Castro schemes might have done more to undermine the credibility of the Commission than anything else that happened while it was conducting its investigation."

Skepticism 

In the years following the release of its report and 26 investigatory evidence volumes in 1964, the Warren Commission has been frequently criticized for some of its methods, important omissions, and conclusions.

The results obtained by the commission as well as its methods were harshly criticized in the years following its publication.

If the major media (CBS, the New York Post, (...)) line up behind the conclusions of the Warren report, in the name of the higher interest of the nation and in the need to unite after the tragedy, on the other hand, many independent investigators, journalists, historians, jurists, academics including Thomas Buchanan, Sylvan Fox, Harold Feldman, Richard E. Sprague, Mark Lane Rush to Judgment, Edward Jay Epstein Inquest, Harold Weisberg's Whitewash, Sylvia Meagher's Accessories After the Fact or Josiah Thompson's Six Seconds in Dallas, will issue opinions opposing the conclusions of the Warren commission based on the same elements collected by its works.

English historian Hugh Trevor-Roper, who read the report, despite the lack of an index, wrote: "The Warren report will have to be judged, not by its soothing success, but by the value of its argument. . I must admit that from the first reading of the report, it seemed impossible to me to join in this general cry of triumph. I had the impression that the text had serious flaws. Moreover, when probing the weak parts, they appeared even weaker than at first sight. »

In 1992, following popular political pressure in the wake of the film JFK, the Assassination Records Review Board (ARRB) was created by the JFK Records Act to collect and preserve the documents relating to the assassination. In a footnote in its final report, the ARRB wrote: "Doubts about the Warren Commission's findings were not restricted to ordinary Americans. Well before 1978, President Johnson, Robert F. Kennedy, and four of the seven members of the Warren Commission all articulated, if sometimes off the record, some level of skepticism about the Commission's basic findings."

The fragility points of the report 

 In its conclusions: the opposition of the summary of the report and the documents constituting the 26 volumes of annexes leading to a falsification of the facts. For example, the Warren Commission argued that direct witnesses to the shooting, who immediately rushed en masse to the grassy knoll after the shots were fired, were fleeing the area of the shooting. In reality, the people present, including a dozen members of the security forces, in particular Sheriff Decker's team, who had given the order to invest the area, all testified that they were running to the search for one or more shooters posted on the grassy Knoll. 
 It also did not interview John Fitzgerald Kennedy's personal doctor, Doctor Georges Burkley who was nevertheless present during the shooting in the convoy of official vehicles then at Parkland Hospital, on board Air Force One, then at Naval Bestheda Hospital during the autopsy. He signed the death certificate and also took delivery of the brain of John Fitzgerald Kennedy which is declared lost in the National Archives. Concerning the conclusions of the Warren commission about the three shootings, the practitioner had declared in 1967: "I would not like to be quoted on this subject".
 The ballistic reports conducted by the F.B.I and the autopsy reports were not the subject of any counter-investigation, which made the commission directly dependent on the work of the latter. The Warren Commission, by decision of Earl Warren, refused to hire its own independent investigators. However, it had its own investigative capacity thanks to direct access to the emergency presidential budget funds granted by President Lyndon Johnson when it was created, to conduct its own investigations. Thus the Warren commission was not informed by the F.B.I of the discovery the day after the attack, on November 23, 1963, by a medical student, William Harper, of a piece of occiput located at the rear left in relation to at the position of the presidential limo during the fatal shot to the head. He had it examined by the professor and medical examiner, Doctor Cairns who measured it and photographed this piece before informing the F.B.I, on November 25, 1963. The latter received instructions not to make any publicity on this subject. It was the Attorney General, Robert F Kennedy, who, informed by a letter from Dr. Cairns transmitted to the Warren Commission, allowed the latter to question the practitioner.
 The non-use by the members of the Warren Commission of the direct elements of the autopsy such as notes, photos and x-rays. He only used drawings by F.B.I artists reproducing photographic images.
 The revelation by Edward Jay Epstein, in his book Inquest published in 1966, that as early as the beginning of 1964, the chief adviser, J. Lee Rankin, had given the outcome of the results of the work of the commission: guilt of Oswald, the latter having acted alone. Even before the creation of the commission, on November 25, 1963, and a few hours after the assassination of Lee Harvey Oswald by Jack Ruby in the premises of the Dallas police, Nicolas Katzenbach, assistant attorney general, had indicated in a memorandum intended of Bill Moyers that: “The public must be convinced that Oswald was the killer; that he had no accomplices still at large; and that evidence was such that he would have been found guilty at trial» creating a political orientation of the results of the investigation, even before the start of the first official investigations and knowledge of the results. Its objective was to cut short the speculations of public opinion either on a plot of communist origin (thesis of the Dallas police) or a plot fomented by the far right to blame the communists (hypothesis defended by the press of communist bloc formed around the USSR).

As early as the 1970s, official members of the Warren Commission questioned its work, in particular Hale Boggs who criticized the influence of J. Edgar Hoover, the historic director of the F.B.I from 1924 to 1972, who had centralized the all of the information from the F.B.I agents before synthesizing it and transmitting it to the Warren Commission. He campaigned for a reopening of the file considering that the director of the F.B.I had lied to the Warren commission. He disappeared in an unsolved plane crash in October 1972.

Commission member Richard Russell told the Washington Post in 1970 that Kennedy had been the victim of a conspiracy criticizing the commission's no-conspiracy finding and saying "we weren't told the truth about Oswald" . John Sherman Cooper also considered the ballistic findings to be "unconvincing". Russell also particularly rejected Arlen Specter's "single bullet" theory, and he asked Earl Warren to indicate his disagreement in a footnote, which the chairman of the commission refused.

Other investigations 
Four other U.S. government or senate investigations have been conducted about the Warren Commission's conclusion or its material in different circumstances.

The Commission Church analyzed in 1976 the work of the CIA and FBI which had communicated the different elements to the Warren Commission Members.

The tree others conclued with the initial conclusions that two shots struck JFK from the rear : the 1968 panel set by Attorney General Ramsey Clark, the 1975 Rockefeller Commission, and the 1978-79 House Select Committee on Assassinations (HSCA), which reexamined the evidence with the help of the largest forensics panel and bringing new materials to the public.

1975 - 1976 : The Church Committee  
In 1975, The Church Committee was created par US Senate after the revelations about illegal actions of federal agency as the FBI, CIA and IRS on the territory of the United States of America and after the political Watergate scandal. The Church Committe carried out investigative work on the assassination of John F. Kennedy on November 22, 1963, questioning 50 witnesses and accessing 3,000 documents.

It focuses on the necessary actions and the support provided by the FBI and the CIA to the Warren Commission and raises the question of the possible connection between the plans to assassinate political leaders abroad, in particular in relation to Fidel Castro. in Cuba, a huge point of international tension in the 1960s, and that of the 35th President of the United States. The Church Commission questioned the process of obtaining the information, blaming federal agencies for failing in their duties and responsibilities and concluding that the investigation into the assassination had been flawed.

The American Senator Richard Schweiker indicated on this subject, in a television interview on June 27, 1976: "The John F. Kennedy assassination investigation was snuffed out before it even began," and that "the fatal mistake the Warren Commission made was to not use its own investigators, but instead to rely on the CIA and FBI personnel, which played directly into the hands of senior intelligence ".

The results of the Church Committee opened the way of the creation of the HSCA, with parallelly the diffusion the 6th Mars 1975, for the first time on television in the show Good Night America of the Zapruder Film, which had been stored by Life Magazine and never showed to the public during twenty years.

1978 - 1979 : The House Selected Committee on Assassinations  
The HSCA involved Congressional hearings and ultimately concluded that Oswald assassinated Kennedy, probably as the result of a conspiracy.  The HSCA concluded that Oswald fired shots number one, two, and four, and that an unknown assassin fired shot number three (but missed) from near the corner of a picket fence that was above and to President Kennedy's right front on the Dealey Plaza grassy knoll. However, this conclusion has also been criticized, especially for its reliance upon disputed acoustic evidence. The HSCA Final Report in 1979 did agree with the Warren Report's conclusion in 1964 that two bullets caused all of President Kennedy's and Governor Connally's injuries, and that both bullets were fired by Oswald from the sixth floor of the Texas School Book Depository.

In his September 1978 testimony to the HSCA, President Ford defended the Warren Commission's investigation as thorough. Ford stated that knowledge of the assassination plots against Castro may have affected the scope of the Commission's investigation but expressed doubt that it would have altered its finding that Oswald acted alone in assassinating Kennedy. By the way, it was also revealed during the declassification of his personnel file in August 2008 by the F.B.I that Gerald Ford had been J. Edgar Hoover's informant in the Warren Commission, informing him through number three in the office of federal investigation, Cartha de Loach, of internal debates and findings as the investigation progresses (J Edgar Hoover had, in fact, removed elements of a tax evasion case implicating him in previous years). The information he transmitted also indicated that two members of the commission including Senator Russel doubted that Lee Harvey Oswald acted alone in firing from the 6th floor and also doubted the ballistic conclusions.

As part of its investigation, the HSCA also evaluated the performance of the Warren Commission, which included interviews and public testimony from the two surviving Commission members (Ford and McCloy) and various Commission legal counsel staff. The Committee concluded in their final report that the Commission was reasonably thorough and acted in good faith, but failed to adequately address the possibility of conspiracy: "...the Warren Commission was not, in some respects, an accurate presentation of all the evidence available to the Commission or a true reflection of the scope of the Commission's work, particularly on the issue of possible conspiracy in the assassination."

The HSCA also pointed to the role of the mafia in the attack because of Cuba. Indeed, the Cuban Castro Revolution of 1959 had caused the criminal organization to lose millions of dollars, which had tried in vain to win the favors of the Cuban leader during the change of regime. In 1959, the income generated by criminal activities amounted to an annual amount of 100 million dollars, i.e. 900 million reported in 2013. However, the criminal organization had been unable to prevent the closure of casinos, pimping places and drug trafficking, and close ties were then forged with the C.I.A to destabilize Fidel Castro's regime and regain a foothold on the island. This information, in particular known from the CIA, had not been transmitted to the Warren Commission nor by the FBI during its first investigation.

The HSCA determined that the gradual change in policy of the John Fitzgerald Kennedy administration toward Cuba, first with the failure of the Bay of Pigs invasion in April 1961, then more sustainably with the missile crisis of October 1962, in order to appease relations with the Cuban regime on a lasting basis and to open up new prospects, contributed to directing, if not slightly, within the many groups of paramilitary operations the most radical fringe of anti-Castro Cubans, American intelligence agents and Mafia criminals who continued their operations to overthrow the regime of Fidel Castro despite requests for formal arrests from the White House.

The HSCA invites the Department of Justice to resume investigations. The latter will respond height years later, arguing the absence of decisive evidence allowing the reopening of an investigation, which is equivalent to supporting the conclusions of Warren report.

On the long term 
The findings of the Warren Commission are generally highly criticized, and while the majority of American citizens believe that Oswald shot President Kennedy, the majority also believe that Oswald was part of a conspiracy and therefore do not believe the official thesis defended by the commission. In 1976, 81% of Americans disputed the findings of the Warren Report, 74% in 1983, 75% in 1993 and 2003.

In 2009, a CBS poll indicated that 74% of respondents believed there had been an official cover-up by the authorities to keep the general public away from the truth.

At the present 
On January 20, 2019, a request made by 60 personalities to officially reopen the investigations into the assassinations of Malcolm X, Robert Kennedy, Martin Luther King and John Kennedy was formulated by the Truth and Reconciliation Committee, of which Robert Blakey is a member (investigator in head of the HSCA), the children of Robert Kennedy, filmmaker and director Oliver Stone, Daniel Ellsberg (the whistleblower on the Pentagon Papers in 1971), or even Doctor Robert McClelland (deceased in September 10, 2019), one of the surgeons at the Parkland Dallas Memorial Hospital who intervened on JFK on November 22, 1963.

Impact on

See also
9/11 Commission
John F. Kennedy assassination conspiracy theories
Presidential Commission
Single-bullet theory

Notes

References 
 
Shenon, Philip (2013). A Cruel and Shocking Act: The Secret History of the Kennedy Assassination. New York: Henry Holt and Co. .

Further reading 

 Macdonald, Dwight. "A Critique of the Warren Report." Esquire, March 1965, pp. 60+.

External links 

 Warren Commission Report (Full Text)
 Warren Commission Hearings (Full Text)
 Assassination Records Review Board
 House Select Committee on Assassinations
 Rockefeller Commission
 Church Committee
 
 
 
 

 
Reports of the United States government
United States documents
Presidency of Lyndon B. Johnson
1963 establishments in the United States
1964 disestablishments in the United States
Public inquiries in the United States
United States Presidential Commissions